Sir John Fogge (born c. 1417/c. 1425) was an English courtier, soldier and supporter of the Woodville family under Edward IV who became an opponent of Richard III.

Family
John Fogge, born about 1417, was the son of John Fogge, esquire, the second surviving son of Sir Thomas Fogge (d. 13 July 1407) and Joan de Valence (d. 8 July 1420), widow of William Costede of Costede, Kent, and daughter of Sir Stephen de Valence of Repton. Fogge's mother was possibly Joan Leigh.

Career
According to Horrox, Fogge had reached the age of majority by 1438, but only came to prominence when he inherited the lands of the senior line on the death of Sir Thomas's grandson and heir, William' by February 1447.

Fogge was an esquire to Henry VI by 1450, and in that year was involved in the suppression of the rebellion of Jack Cade. He was appointed Sheriff of Kent in November 1453. He was made Comptroller of the Household in 1460 under Henry VI, and knighted the following year.

Despite his earlier service under Henry VI, when the future Edward IV landed in England in June 1460, Fogge joined the Yorkists, and was granted Tonford in Thanington and Dane Court in Boughton under Blean, manors to which he claimed to be entitled by reversion.

After the Yorkist victory at the Battle of Towton on 29 March 1461, 'Fogge emerged as a leading royal associate in Kent, heading all commissions named in the county'. In 1461, he was granted the office of Keeper of the Writs of the Court of Common Pleas, and took part in the investigation of the possible treason of Sir Thomas Cooke, Lord Mayor of London. He was Treasurer of the Household to Edward IV from 1461 to 1468, as well as a member of the King's council, and in March 1462 he and others were granted custody of the lands of John de Vere, 12th Earl of Oxford, forfeited to the crown as a result of the Earl's attainder. In 1469, it was alleged that Fogge was among those whose 'covetous rule and gydynge' had brought Edward IV and the kingdom to 'great poverty and misery'.

In 1461 and 1463 he was elected to Parliament as Knight of the Shire for Kent, and in 1467 as MP for Canterbury. He was Sheriff of Kent in 1472 and 1479.

According to Horrox, his name is not found in commissions during the Readeption of Henry VI, suggesting the possibility that he went into exile with Edward IV.

When Edward IV regained the throne, Fogge was rewarded for his loyalty with grants of land, as well as a grant for twelve years of gold and silver mines in Devon and Cornwall. During this period Fogge built close ties to the Prince of Wales, and from 1473 was a member of his council and administrator of his property. He was made Chamberlain jointly with Sir John Scott. He again represented Kent in parliament in 1478 and 1483.

In 1483, the future Richard III of England appointed himself Protector of Edward IV's young son and heir, Edward V, accusing the Woodvilles of plotting against him. Sir Thomas More says that Fogge took sanctuary at this time, and that Richard III was prepared to treat him with favour. Despite this apparent reconciliation, Fogge supported Richard Guildford in Kent against Richard III, a rising in support of Edward V, and became part of the unsuccessful Buckingham's rebellion. 

The rising was blocked at Gravesend by John Howard, 1st Duke of Norfolk, and the rebel force retreated. Fogge was attainted, and much of his property was granted to Sir Ralph Ashton, who had been loyal to the King, and who was already in conflict with Fogge over a portion of the Kyriell inheritance from Fogge's first marriage. In February 1485 Fogge bound himself to good behaviour and was pardoned, and four of his manors were returned to him.

Fogge was a supporter of Henry Tudor. After the latter's accession, however, perhaps due to advancing age, Fogge played little part in national affairs.

Fogge left a will dated 15 July 1490, and had died by 9 November of that year.

He built and endowed the church at Ashford, Kent as well as the College at Ashford. He was buried beneath a handsome altar-tomb in the church, where he is also commemorated in a memorial window.

The Fogge arms were Argent on a fess between three annulets sable three mullets pierced of the first. The crest was a unicorn's head, argent. At the Siege of Rouen in 1418, a Thomas Fogge who was likely his great great uncle, carried the same arms differenced by having unpierced mullets.

Literary references
A character named 'Jon Fogge', who appears to be based on this knight, appears in Marjorie Bowen's 1929 novel Dickon about the life of Richard III. In the novel he serves as a sort of sinister shadow, portending the violent fate of the king.

Marriages and issue
Fogge married firstly, by the early 1440s, Alice de Criol or Kyriell, daughter of the Yorkist soldier Sir Thomas de Criol of Westenhanger, beheaded after the Second Battle of St Albans by order of Margaret of Anjou. The marriage brought him Westenhanger Castle.
They had a son and heir, 
John Fogge (d.1501), who married Joanne Leigh, daughter of Sir Richard Leigh  Lord Mayor of London, (1460, 1469). Their son, 
Sir John Fogge (d.1533), Marshal of Calais and Sheriff of Kent, married Margaret Goldwell, daughter of Jeffrey Goldwell (brother of James Goldwell, Bishop of Norwich), by whom he had three sons and three daughters:
Sir John Fogge (d.1564) of Repton in Ashford, Kent, eldest son, Sheriff of Kent in 1545, who married firstly Margaret Brooke, the daughter of Thomas Brooke, 8th Baron Cobham (d. 19 July 1529) by his first wife, Dorothy Heydon, and secondly Catherine, the daughter of one Holand of Calais.
William Fogge (d.1535) of Canterbury, buried in Canterbury Cathedral.
George Fogge (died c.1591) of Brabourne and Repton, who married firstly Margaret Kempe (daughter of Sir William Kempe of Olantigh by his second wife, Eleanor Browne, widow of (see below) Thomas Fogge (d. 16 August 1612), and daughter and heir of Robert Browne, son of Sir Thomas Browne of Betchworth Castle), and secondly Honor Palmer, daughter of Sir Thomas Palmer.
Margaret Fogge, who married Sir Humphrey Stafford. - but see below
Abigail Fogge, who married Cranmer Brooke (died c.1547) of Ashford, son of Thomas Brooke (third son of Thomas Brooke, 8th Baron Cobham (d. 19 July 1529)), and Susan Cranmer, niece of Archbishop Thomas Cranmer.
Daughter whose name is not given in the Fogge pedigree.

John Fogge married secondly, by 1458, Alice Haute or Hawte (born c.1444), the daughter of William Haute, Esquire, MP (d.1462) of Bishopsbourne, Kent, and Joan Woodville, daughter of Richard Woodville. Richard Woodville was also the father of Richard Woodville, 1st Earl Rivers, and the grandfather of Elizabeth Woodville,
 and Fogge's second wife, Alice Haute was thus Elizabeth Woodville's first cousin. After her marriage to Edward IV, Elizabeth Woodville brought her favourite female relatives to court. Fogge's second wife, Alice Haute, was one of her five ladies-in-waiting during the 1460s.

By Alice Haute, Fogge had a son and three daughters:

Thomas Fogge (d. 16 August 1512), esquire, of Ashford, Great Mongeham, Sutton Farm (in Sutton), Tunford (in Thanington), and Walmer, Kent, Sergeant Porter of Calais to Henry VII and Henry VIII. He married before 9 December 1509 Eleanor Browne, daughter of Robert Browne, esquire, and granddaughter of Sir Thomas Browne. They had two daughters, Alice (wife of Edward Scott and Robert Oxenbridge, Knt.) and Anne (wife of William Scott and Henry Isham). He was buried in the church at Ashford. He left a will dated 4 August 1512, proved 16 October 1512 (P.C.C. 9 Fetiplace).
Anne Fogge.
Elizabeth Fogge.
Margaret Fogge, who married her father's ward, Sir Humphrey Stafford (d. 22 September 1545) of Cottered and Rushden, Hertfordshire, by whom she was the mother of three sons and three daughters, including Sir Humphrey Stafford, who married Margaret Tame, daughter of Sir Edmund Tame, and Sir William Stafford, who married Mary Boleyn. Stafford was the son of Humphrey Stafford (died 1486).

Many sources state that Sir Thomas Greene married Fogge's daughter, Jane, by whom he was the father of Maud Green, mother of Catherine Parr. However Fogge's will, as transcribed by Pearman, states that he has three daughters, Anne, Elizabeth and Margaret, and makes no mention of a daughter Jane. The official biographers of Catherine Parr, Susan E. James and Linda Porter, state that Jane Fogge was the granddaughter of Sir John Fogge, knt.

Notes

References

External links
Will of Thomas Fogge, proved 21 October 1512, PROB 11/17/267, National Archives Retrieved 23 September 2013
The town and parish of Ashford, The History and Topographical Survey of the County of Kent: Volume 7 (1798), pp. 526–545 Retrieved 23 September 2013
https://web.archive.org/web/20110710171822/http://edwardv1483.com/index.php?p=1_7_Richard-s-Rebels 

1410s births
1490 deaths
People from Kent
English MPs 1461
English soldiers
15th-century soldiers
English MPs 1463
High Sheriffs of Kent
Treasurers of the Household
English MPs 1467
English MPs 1478
English MPs 1483